Children in Need 2010 was a campaign held in the United Kingdom to raise money for Children in Need. 2010 marked the 30th anniversary of the appeal which culminated in a live broadcast on BBC One and ITV1 which began on the evening of Friday 19 November and ran until the early hours of Saturday 20th. The broadcast was hosted by Terry Wogan, with Tess Daly from 7pm until 10pm and Fearne Cotton from 10:35pm until 2am. Peter Andre hosted from the BT Tower. The show was broadcast from BBC Television Centre in London but also included regional opt-outs hosted from various locations around the UK including Cardiff and Glasgow, viewers in Northern Ireland could see the whole show Live from London for the first time instead of having their own opt out as in previous years instead the Northern Ireland concert was broadcast live on BBC Radio Ulster and highlights on BBC One Northern Ireland the next day with Reggie Yates and John Daly.  They returned to Belfast every so often to show fundraising from Northern Ireland but it wasn't a Live broadcast as in previous years. In 2010 contributions fell short of the previous year's fund-raising total. The 2010 event raised £18,098,199 compared to £20,309,747 in 2009.

Appeals

Slogan
 "Show your spots, Let's Raise Lots"

Sketches
 "Come Dine With Dragons" – Come Dine with Me/Dragons' Den crossover episode
 "East Street" – Coronation Street/EastEnders crossover episode
 Merlin
 Doctor Who tea party featuring a preview of the 2010 Christmas special, "A Christmas Carol".

Professional performances
In Order of Appearance:
 Cheryl Cole - "Promise This"
 Westlife - "Safe" (from Belfast)
 Kylie Minogue - "Better than Today"
 The Saturdays - "Higher" (from Cardiff)
 JLS - "Love You More"
 Susan Boyle - "Perfect Day"
 Alexandra Burke - "Start Without You" (from Glasgow)
 Take That - "The Flood" and "Never Forget"
 We Will Rock You cast. (from Glasgow)
 Only Men Aloud "Don't Stop Believing"
 Tom Jones
 Jedward "All The Small Things"
 Pixie Lott - "Turn it Up"
 The Script (from Belfast) "Nothing"
 McFly - "Shine a Light" (from Glasgow)
 Cee Lo Green - "Forget You"
 Phantom of the Opera - "Music of the Night"
 Ellie Goulding - "Starry Eyed"
 Maroon 5 "Give a Little More"
 Heaven 17 "Temptation"
 Alesha Dixon - "Radio" (pre-orders of the single will be donated to the charity)
 The Wanted - "All Time Low"

Charity special performances
 Peter Andre – Michael Jackson tribute, singing "Man in the Mirror".
 The BBC newsreaders performed a Lady Gaga inspired skit choreographed by Louie Spence. Featured songs were "Poker Face", "Paparazzi" and "Bad Romance".
 Loose Women performing "The Promise" by Girls Aloud.
 A Children in Need Strictly Come Dancing special featuring Harry Judd off McFly competing against Rochelle Wiseman off the Saturdays.
 Hairy Bikers performing Meat Loaf's "Bat Out of Hell".

Children in Need: 50 Greatest Moments
A two part special Children in Need: 50 Greatest Moments aired on BBC Three, on 9 and 16 November and featured top moments of the appeal throughout the years as well as some of the celebrities who participated in them. The top 10 was also shown on the Telethon.

Locations
 BBC Television Centre, London
 SECC, Glasgow - hosted by Jackie Bird and John Barrowman
 Millennium Stadium, Cardiff - hosted by The One Show host, Alex Jones
 Odyssey Arena, Belfast - hosted by BBC Northern Ireland's John Daly and BBC Radio 1 host Reggie Yates

Official single
"Love You More" by JLS is the official single.

Other activities 
As in previous years, the TV show Countryfile sold a calendar in aid of the appeal.

The BBC Radio 4 show PM released a CD of listeners' performances of the title music for Upstairs, Downstairs, composed by Alexander Faris, in a variety of styles from bossa nova to heavy metal, raising over £70,000.

A number of high-profile charity events not directly affiliated with the BBC also contributed a large amount of cash for the 2010 appeal, such as the Chris Evans 'Drive and Dine Magnificent Seven' motorsport event held in Hampshire at Chewton Glen.

Totals
The following are totals with the times they were announced on the televised show.

Total number of phone calls during the telethon

BT said that it handled 185,066 calls from viewers across the country during the event. Steve Smith, BT's eDonate platform manager, said: "At peak times, the BT network was handling more than 42 calls every second. More than 5,000 volunteers in 51 call centres across the UK manned the phone lines, answering more than 185,000 calls, which was a great way to celebrate 30 years of telethons."

See also
 Children in Need
 Pudsey Bear

References

External links
 Children in Need website

2010
2010 in British television
November 2010 events in the United Kingdom